Stuart Liddell MBE (born 12 January 1973) is a Scottish bagpipe player. As well as competing in solo competitions, he is the Pipe major of the Inveraray and District Pipe Band.

Early life
He was born in Oban on 12 January 1973 and spent his early years in Inveroran, near Bridge of Orchy. His father Billy was an accomplished musician, as is his mother Agnes, and his grandfather was Ronnie McCallum, piper to the Duke of Argyll and a prominent piping tutor. At the age of four the family moved to Moffat in Dumfriesshire where Stuart went to school. The family moved to Inveraray, his mother's home town, in 1983.

Band history

For ten years (1998–2008), he played with the Simon Fraser University Pipe Band in Burnaby, British Columbia. With the SFU Pipe band he won three World Pipe Band Championship titles, in 1999, 2001, and 2008. Before joining the SFU Pipe Band, he played with ScottishPower Pipe Band.

Liddell lives in Inveraray and is Pipe major of the Grade 1 Inveraray & District Pipe Band, which he founded in 2003.

Stuart Liddell has won the World Pipe Band Championships as Pipe major of Inveraray & District Pipe Band in 2017 and 2019.

Solo Prizes
Liddell has won many of the top awards in solo piping, including the Gold Medal at the Argyllshire Gathering (2000), the Gold Medal at the Northern Meeting (2004), the former winner's Clasp at the Northern Meeting (2007 & 2009), the Bratach Gorm at the Scottish Piping Society of London (2009) and

He has won the Glenfiddich Piping Championship three times: 2009, 2014  and 2020. 
In 2023, Liddell was made a Member of the British Empire (MBE) in King Charles III’s first-ever New Year’s Honours.

He is known for his fast playing and innovative arrangements of piping standards.

Recordings
In 2007, Liddell released his first solo recording, Inveroran. He has also appeared on several recordings of Simon Fraser University Pipe Band, with solo tracks on many discs, including:
 1997 Piping Centre Recital Series Vol.2
 Scottish Power Pipe Band – Tartan Weave
 Simon Fraser University Pipe Band – Live at Carnegie Hall
 Simon Fraser University Pipe Band - Down Under
 Awesome Pipers - 2004
 Simon Fraser University Pipe Band – On Home Ground
 Inveroran

References

Great Highland bagpipe players
People from Oban
Living people
Gold Medal winners (bagpipes)
Scottish bagpipe players
1973 births